Matthew "Matt" Payne (born 3 October 2002) is a New Zealand racing driver from Auckland, New Zealand. He is currently competing in the Dunlop Super2 Series with Grove Racing, driving the No. 10 Nissan Altima L33. Payne is also inaugural inductee of the Grove Junior Team, a program to fast track young drivers into the Supercars Championship. In 2022 Payne will make his Bathurst 1000 debut driving alongside current Bathurst champion Lee Holdsworth in the Grove Racing Ford Mustang GT FN.

Racing career

Toyota Racing Series
After turning heads with his karting success, Payne tested the FT-50 (older spec TRS) and impressed immediately with confirmation coming in December 2020 that Payne would contest the full three round 2021 Toyota Racing Series for M2 Motorsport. 

The 2021 New Zealand Grand Prix was the opening round of the season and was held at Hampton Downs Motorsport Park, due to the COVID-19 pandemic the series lacked international drivers. To compensate the event organizers called on experienced New Zealand racing drivers such as Shane Van Gisbergen, Greg Murphy & Andre Heimgartner to heighten the quantity and quality of the field. Payne impressed in his open-wheel debut finishing third in all three races over the weekend including the NZGP. Payne went on to win five of the remaining six races, winning the 2021 Toyota Racing Series conformably over second placed Kaleb Ngatoa.

Racing record

Career summary

* Season still in progress

Toyota Racing Series results 

(key) (Races in bold indicate pole position) (Races in italics indicate fastest lap)

Australian Carrera Cup Championship results
(key) (Races in bold indicate pole position – 1 point awarded all races) (Races in italics indicate fastest lap) (* signifies that driver lead feature race for at least one lap – 1 point awarded)

Super2 Series results
(key) (Race results only)

Supercars Championship results

Bathurst 1000 results

European Le Mans Series results
(key) (Races in bold indicate pole position) (Races in italics indicate fastest lap)

References

External links

2002 births
New Zealand racing drivers
Toyota Racing Series drivers
Living people
Supercars Championship drivers
M2 Competition drivers
European Le Mans Series drivers
24H Series drivers
Karting World Championship drivers
Kelly Racing drivers